Pentacarbonylhydridomanganese is an organometallic compound with formula HMn(CO)5. This compound is one of the most stable "first-row" transition metal hydrides.

Preparation
It was first reported in 1931. Of the several ways to produce this compound, is the protonation of the pentacarbonyl manganate anion.  The latter is formed from reduction of dimanganese decacarbonyl, (Mn(CO)5)2. The reaction is shown below.

LiHB(C2H5)3 (Superhydride) + ½ Mn2(CO)10 → Li[Mn(CO)5] + ½ H2 + (C2H5)3B

Li[Mn(CO)5] + CF3SO3H → HMn(CO)5 + 

Salts of  can be isolated as crystalline  (μ-nitrido—bis-(triphenylphosphorus)) salt, which is smoothly protonated by CF3SO3H.

PPN[Mn(CO)5] + CF3SO3H → HMn(CO)5 + 

This compound can also be formed by the reaction of a solution of pentacarbonyl(trimethylsilyl)manganese with water.  The reaction is shown below.

2 (CO)5MnSiMe3 + H2O → HMn(CO)5 + Me3SiOSiMe3

Structure and properties

The compound has octahedral symmetry  and its molecular point group is C4v. The H-Mn bond length is 1.44 ± 0.03 Å. A gas phase electron diffraction study  confirms this data.

The structure of HMn(CO)5 has been studied by many methods including X-ray diffraction, neutron diffraction, and electron diffraction. The occupied molecular orbitals on the top are the 2 t2g orbitals. They are characterized as metal 3dπ orbitals. Since the antibonding 2π orbitals interact with the carbonyl groups, (or in this case) the t2g orbital is stabilized compared to the 3dπ orbital, which in turn will cause changes in the sigma and pi interactions.

Main reactions

The pKa of HMn(CO)5 in water is 7.1. It is thus comparable to hydrogen sulfide, a common inorganic acid, in its acidity.

A common reaction involving the HMn(CO)5 species is substitution of the CO ligands by organophosphines, as occurs both thermally and photochemically.  In this way the following derivatives form: MnH(CO)3[P]2, MnH(CO)2[P]3, and MnH(CO)[P]4, (where [P] = P(OEt)3, PPh(OEt)2, PPh2OEt, PPh(OiPr)2).

The compound HMn(CO)5 can be used to reduce olefins and other organic compounds, as well as metal halides.

This compound can be methylated with diazomethane.

HMn(CO)5 + CH2N2 → Mn(CO)5CH3 + N2

Notes

Carbonyl complexes
Organomanganese compounds
Metal hydrides
Substances discovered in the 1930s